Complications is an American drama television series created by Matt Nix. Starring Jason O'Mara and Jessica Szohr, the series aired on USA Network from June 18 through August 13, 2015. On August 28, 2015, USA Network cancelled Complications.

Premise
An exhausted and disillusioned suburban ER doctor witnesses a drive-by shooting in which a little boy is seriously injured. While attending to the child's wounds, the doctor shoots and kills a street gang member in order to save the lives of himself and the boy. This one act, seen by some to make him a hero, leads to unexpected complications in his personal and professional life, which forces him to re-evaluate his beliefs about medicine and helping others.

Cast

Main characters
 Jason O'Mara as Dr. John Ellison
 Jessica Szohr as Nurse Gretchen Polk, a coworker of John
 Beth Riesgraf as Samantha Ellison, John's wife
 Lauren Stamile as Dr. Bridget O'Neil, a coworker of John
 Albert C. Bates as Oliver Ellison, John & Sam Ellison's son

Recurring
 Chris Chalk as Darius
 Tim Peper as Kyle Hawkins, a lawyer and friend of Samantha
 Eric Edelstein as Jed, a friend of Gretchen 
 Conphidance as CJ, cousin to Antoine and keeps Dr. John Ellison on check; affiliated with Darius
 RonReaco Lee as Dr. Quentin Harper, another ER doctor
 Brick Jackson as Maurice, CJ's best friend
 Anna Enger as Nurse Mia Joy
 Christine Horn as Sherry Perkins
 Chris Greene as Chris Maddox, affiliated with Darius
 Ty Glascoe as Boney, affiliated with Darius
 Gino Vento as Oscar 'Tico' Rodriguez, member of the Loco's gang.
 Jaiden Byrd as Antoine Tyler, the kid who was shot in the middle of the street while walking with CJ.

Episodes

Development and production
Matt Nix directed the pilot episode. In March 2014, USA Network ordered the pilot to series. Production began in September 2014 in Atlanta, Georgia.

Reception

Critical response 
Complications has received generally mixed reviews from critics. Review aggregator Rotten Tomatoes gives the first season of the show a rating of 59%, based on 17 reviews, with an average rating of 6.1/10. The site's consensus states, "Complications has no shortage of ambition - or intriguing characters and ideas - although its complicated plot occasionally beggars belief." Metacritic gives the show a score of 55 out of 100, based on 14 critics, indicating "generally mixed reviews".

Ratings

References

External links 

 
 

2015 American television series debuts
2015 American television series endings
2010s American crime drama television series
2010s American LGBT-related drama television series
2010s American medical television series
English-language television shows
Television series by 20th Century Fox Television
Television shows filmed in Atlanta
Television shows set in Atlanta
American thriller television series
USA Network original programming